Myoxocephalus is a genus of marine ray-finned fishes belonging to the family Cottidae, the typical sculpins. They are found in the norther Pacific, Arctic and Atlantic Oceans, with a few species in lakes.

Taxonomy
Myoxocephalus was first proposed as a monospecific genus in 1811 by Tilesius when he described Myoxocephalus stelleri from Kamchatka. The 5th edition of Fishes of the World classifies this genus in the subfamily Cottinae of the family Cottidae but other authorities classify it in the subfamily Myoxocephalinae of the family Psychrolutidae, although others place the subfamily Myoxocephalinae within the Cottidae.

Species
There are currently 14 recognized species in this genus:
 Myoxocephalus aenaeus (Mitchill, 1814) (Grubby)
 Myoxocephalus brandtii (Steindachner, 1867)
 Myoxocephalus jaok (G. Cuvier, 1829) (Plain sculpin)
 Myoxocephalus niger (T. H. Bean, 1881) (Warthead sculpin)
 Myoxocephalus ochotensis (P. J. Schmidt, 1929) 		 	 
 Myoxocephalus octodecemspinosus (Mitchill, 1815) (Longhorn sculpin)
 Myoxocephalus polyacanthocephalus (Pallas, 1814) (Great sculpin)
 Myoxocephalus quadricornis (Linnaeus, 1758) (Fourhorn sculpin)
 Myoxocephalus scorpioides (O. Fabricius, 1780) (Arctic sculpin)
 Myoxocephalus scorpius (Linnaeus, 1758) (Shorthorn sculpin)
 Myoxocephalus sinensis (Sauvage, 1873) 	 
 Myoxocephalus stelleri (Tilesius, 1811) (Steller's sculpin)
 Myoxocephalus thompsonii (Girard, 1851) (Deepwater sculpin)
 Myoxocephalus tuberculatus (Soldatov & Pavlenko, 1922) 	 

In 2020 workers undertook a comparison of the Mitochondrial DNA of the fourhorn sculpin and the belligerent sculpin (Megalcottus platycephalus) and found that the fourhorn sculpin was more closely related to the belligerent sculpin than it was to the other species in the genus Myoxocephalus, they proposed that the fourhorn sculpin be reclassified as a member of the genus Megalocottus.

Characteristics
Myoxocephalus sculpins have a no scales above the lateral line, which lacks bony plates, on the body, which may be naked or have bony plates, scutes or small, sharp spines. The head is large and deep and has a covering of thick skin, there are no bony granulations on the head bit some species have warty knobs or skin flaps. The head has thin sensory canals. The upper spine on the preoperculum is elongated with a wide base and points diagonally upwards. The upper jaw clearly projects beyond the lower and there are vomerine teeth but no palatine teeth. There is always a slit behind d the fourth gill arch but this may be reduced to a pore. The spiny dorsal fin is slight larger or similar in size to the soft-rayed dorsal fin and they are connected. In males the pelvic fins typically bo not extend as far as the anus. The soft rays of the dorsal, anal and pectoral fins are simple.

Distribution and habitat
Myoxocephalus sculpins are found in the northern Pacific and Atlantic Oceans and the Arctic Ocean. There are cases where they have become landlocked in lakes. They are fishes of the coast and continental shelf and many species can tolerate low salinities and they are found over sand, mud or rocks.

Biology
Myoxocephalus Sculpins are predators on fishes and benthic invertebrates. They spawn in winter and spring, laying demersal eggs which the males guard.

Sources

 
Cottinae
Ray-finned fish genera
Taxa named by Wilhelm Gottlieb Tilesius von Tilenau
Taxonomy articles created by Polbot